Šibovi  is a settlement in the Bosnia and Herzegovina, Republika Srpska entity, Kotor Varoš Municipality.

According to the data on Census Year of 1991, in this populated place lived 671 citizens.

Population

See also
Kotor Varoš

References

Villages in Bosnia and Herzegovina